Heat shock 70 kDa protein 13 is a protein that in humans is encoded by the HSPA13 gene.

The protein encoded by this gene is a member of the heat shock protein 70 family and is found associated with microsomes. Members of this protein family play a role in the processing of cytosolic and secretory proteins, as well as in the removal of denatured or incorrectly folded proteins. The encoded protein contains an ATPase domain and has been shown to associate with a ubiquitin-like protein.

References

Further reading